Pierre Vermeulen (born 16 March 1956 in Kerkrade) is a Dutch footballer who was active as a forward. Vermeulen made his professional debut at Roda JC and also played for Feyenoord Rotterdam, MVV Maastricht, Paris Saint-Germain FC, Tours FC, and Angers SCO.

Honours
 1983-84 : Eredivisie winner with Feyenoord
 1983-84 : KNVB Cup winner with Feyenoord
 1985-86 : Ligue 1 winner with Paris Saint-Germain

References 

1956 births
Living people
Association football forwards
Dutch expatriate footballers
Dutch footballers
Eredivisie players
Expatriate footballers in France
Dutch expatriate sportspeople in France
Roda JC Kerkrade players
Feyenoord players
MVV Maastricht players
Paris Saint-Germain F.C. players
Tours FC players
Angers SCO players
Ligue 1 players
Ligue 2 players
Netherlands international footballers
Sportspeople from Kerkrade
Footballers from Limburg (Netherlands)